Ruth Meeme (born 22 January 1990) is an Ugandan netball player who represents Uganda internationally and plays in the position of wing attack. She has represented Uganda at the 2011 All-Africa Games 2018 Commonwealth Games and also competed at two World Cup tournaments in 2015 and in 2019.

She was a key member of the Ugandan side which claimed a gold medal in the netball team event at the 2011 All-Africa Games.

In September 2019, she was included in the Ugandan squad for the 2019 African Netball Championships.

References 

1990 births
Living people
Ugandan netball players
Netball players at the 2018 Commonwealth Games
Commonwealth Games competitors for Uganda
2019 Netball World Cup players
Competitors at the 2011 All-Africa Games
African Games competitors for Uganda